State Trunk Highway 170 (often called Highway 170, STH-170 or WIS 170) is a  state highway in St. Croix and Dunn counties in Wisconsin, United States that runs east–west from Glenwood City to near Colfax.

Route description
WIS 170 begins at the intersection of 1st street and Oak Street in Glenwood City. 1st Street north and Oak Street west of the intersection are part of WIS 128. The highway runs south along 1st Street until meeting Maple Street, on which it runs east. It continues along this routing until it reaches Downing, where it intersects County Trunk Highway (CTH) G and CTH-Q. East of Downing, the route starts following a railroad which it follows or runs near for the rest of the route. Within Boyceville, the highway follows a very short concurrency with WIS 79. East of Boyceville, the highway follows or stays near the Hay River, which the railroad also follows. It passes through an intersection with WIS 25 in Wheeler and continues along the railroad/Hay River alignment until the Hay River drains into Tainter Lake, east of which the highway follows the railroad along the Red Cedar River before terminating at WIS 40 in Colfax.

Major intersections

See also

References

External links

170
Transportation in St. Croix County, Wisconsin
Transportation in Dunn County, Wisconsin